Leapp or LEAPP may refer to:

 Land Environment Air Picture Provision, a British military air traffic technology
 Leapp (software), an open-source tool for upgrading, migrating, and containerizing Red Hat Linux-based computer systems